Sonnenhübel is a mountain of Saxony, southeastern Germany.

Mountains of Saxony
Forests and woodlands of Saxony
Lusatian Highlands